Spider beetles make up the subfamily Ptininae, in the family Ptinidae. There are approximately 70 genera and 600 species in the subfamily, with about 12 genera and 70 species in North America north of Mexico.

Spider beetles have round bodies with long, slender legs. Many species are flightless, either in females only or both sexes. They are generally 1–5 mm long, and reproduce at the rate of two to three generations per year. They are so named because of a resemblance to spiders. Some species have long legs, antennae that can seem like an additional pair of legs, and a body shape that may appear superficially like that of a spider.

The larvae and the adults of most spider beetles are scavengers on dry plant or animal matter, but some species are known to be ant associates.

The subfamily Ptininae, along with Anobiinae and several others, were formerly considered members of the family Anobiidae, but the family name has since been changed to Ptinidae.

Genera
These genera belong to the subfamily Ptininae:

 Acanthaptinus Philips, 2005
 Africogenius Borowski, 2000
 Bellesus Özdikmen, 2010
 Casapus Wollaston, 1862 g
 Cavoptinus Pic, 1931
 Chilenogenius Pic, 1947
 Coleoaethes Philips, 1998 g
 Cryptopeniculus Philips, 2004 g
 Cylindroptinus Pic, 1910
 Cyphoniptus Bellés, 1992
 Dignomus Wollaston, 1862 g
 Diphobia Olliff, 1886
 Diplocotes Westwood, 1869 g
 Diplocotidus Peringuey, 1899
 Ectrephes Pascoe, 1866 g
 Enasiba Olliff, 1886
 Epauloecus Mulsant & Rey, 1868 b
 Eurostodes Reitter, 1884 g
 Eurostoptinus Pic, 1895
 Gibbium Scopoli, 1777 i c g b
 Gnostus Westwood, 1855 i c g b
 Hanumanus Bellés, 1991
 Hexaplocotes Lea, 1906
 Kedirinus Bellés, 1991 g
 Lachnoniptus Philip, 1998 g
 Lapidoniptus Belles, 1981 g
 Luzonoptinus Pic, 1923
 Maheoptinus Pic, 1903
 Meziomorphum Pic, 1898 g
 Mezium Curtis, 1828 i c g b
 Myrmecoptinus Wasmann, 1916 g
 Neoptinus Gahan, 1900
 Niptinus Fall, 1905 i c g b
 Niptodes Reitter, 1884 g
 Niptomezium Pic, 1902
 Niptus Boieldieu, 1856 i c g b
 Okamninus Mynhardt & Philips, 2013 g
 Oviedinus Bellés, 2010 g
 Paulianoptinus Bellés, 1991
 Paussoptinus Lea, 1905
 Piarus Wollaston, 1862 g
 Pitnus Gorham, 1883 i c g
 Polyplocotes Westwood, 1869
 Prosternoptinus Bellés, 1985
 Pseudeurostus Heyden, 1906 i c g b
 Ptinus Linnaeus, 1766 i c g b
 Silisoptinus Pic, 1917
 Singularivultus Bellés, 1991
 Sphaericus Wollaston, 1854 i c g b
 Stereocaulophilus Belles, 1994 g
 Sucinoptinus Bellés, 2007 g
 Sulcoptinus Bellés, 1988 g
 Tipnus Thomson, 1863 i c g
 Trigonogenioptinus Pic, 1937
 Trigonogenius Solier, 1849 i g b
 Tropicoptinus Belles, 1998 g
 Trymolophus Bellés, 1990 g
 Xylodes Waterhouse, 1876 g

Data sources: i = ITIS, c = Catalogue of Life, g = GBIF, b = Bugguide.net

Gallery

See also
 List of Ptinidae genera

References

External links

Ptinidae